Emoción, Canto y guitarra is the sixth album by the Argentine singer Jorge Cafrune, released in Argentina in 1964. There is a Uruguayan version of the disc, also released by CBS.

In 1990 it was reissued under the name of Zamba de mi esperanza by Sony Music-Columbia.

Track listing 
"Zamba de mi esperanza (En la ONU)"
"Chacarera de Gualiama" (HyR)
"Vidala del lapacho"
"Cancionera"
"La niña de los lapachos"
"Zamba del riego"
"El pescador"
"India madre" (H y R)
"Zambita del caminante"
"La vi por vez primera"
"Tierno nogal"
"Sin caballo y en Montiel"

References 

Jorge Cafrune albums
1964 albums
CBS Records albums